is a Japanese footballer currently playing as a right back for Nagano Parceiro from 2023.

Career 

After graduation at High School. On 11 October 2018, Ono begin first professional career with Matsumoto Yamaga from 2019.

In 2022, Ono participated in 31 games as a top team, but on November 22 at same year, he was announced expire contract at club. On 20 December at same year, Ono officially transfer to Nagano rival club, Nagano Parceiro for upcoming 2023 season.

Career statistics

Club 
.

Notes

References

External links

1996 births
Living people
Japanese footballers
Association football defenders
Hannan University alumni
J2 League players
J3 League players
Matsumoto Yamaga FC players
AC Nagano Parceiro players
Sportspeople from Tokyo